Andrzej Polkowski (5 September 1939 – 5 September 2019) was a Polish translator. He translated around forty titles across several genres, including children's literature (including the Harry Potter series), fantasy, science fiction and history. He translated many publications for the Media Rodzina publishing house.

References 

Polish male writers
Harry Potter in translation
2019 deaths
1939 births
Polish translators
Polish–English translators